Equestrian was contested at the 2002 Asian Games in Busan Equestrian Grounds, Busan, South Korea. Equestrian was contested from 2 to 14 October. There were three equestrian disciplines: dressage, eventing and jumping. All three disciplines are further divided into individual and team contests for a total of six events.

Schedule

Medalists

Medal table

Participating nations
A total of 80 athletes from 10 nations competed in equestrian at the 2002 Asian Games:

References
2002 Asian Games Report, Pages 394–400

External links
 2002 Asian Games official website

 
2002
Equestrian
2002 in equestrian
2002 Asian Games